The St. Louis Giants were an independent Negro league baseball team in 1924 based in St. Louis, Missouri. They were a separate team from the St. Louis Giants/Stars who played in the Negro National League at the same time.

The club featured future Baseball Hall of Famer Willie Wells.

References

Negro league baseball teams
Baseball teams established in 1924
Baseball teams disestablished in 1924
1924 establishments in Missouri